A bird is a feathered, winged, bipedal, warm-blooded, egg-laying, vertebrate.

Bird, BIRD, or the bird may also refer to:

Arts and entertainment

Fictional characters
Tracy "Bird" Van Adams, in the Soul Food film and TV series
Bird, of the Barksdale Organization in TV series The Wire
 Bird, in the TV series WordWorld
 Bird (The Dumping Ground character)
 Bird, in the TV series Bob the Builder

Film and television
Bird (1988 film), a film about Charlie "Bird" Parker
Bird (2017 film), a Russian comedy-drama film
The Birds (1963 film), a horror-thriller film by Alfred Hitchcock

Music

Artists
Charlie “Bird” Parker (1920–1955), a jazz saxophonist
Bird (band)
Bird (singer) (Yuki Kitayama, born 1975), a Japanese singer
Bird Thongchai McIntyre (born 1958), Thai singer
Yuan Zhang (born 1985), or Bird, of Top Combine

Albums
Bird (B.A.L.L. album), 1988
Bird (Lisbeth Scott album), 2015
Bird (single album), by Namjoo, 2020
Bird, an album by Gary Jules
Bird: The Complete Charlie Parker on Verve, a 1990 box set by Charlie Parker

Songs
"Bird", a song by Exo, 2019
"Bird", a song by Ha Sung-woon from the 2019 EP My Moment
"Bird", a 2007 song by Mikuni Shimokawa
"Bird", a song by Tristania from the 2005 album Ashes
"The Bird", a composition by Charlie Parker, 1947
"The Bird" (Jerry Reed song), 1982
"The Bird" (The Time song), 1984
"The Bird", a song by George Jones from the 1987 album Too Wild Too Long

Books
The Bird: The Life and Legacy of Mark Fidrych, a 2013 book by Doug Wilson

Games 
Bird Opening, a chess opening

Businesses and organisations
Bird (company), an American scooter share company
Bird College, a performing arts college in London, England
BIRD Foundation, an Israel–U.S. R&D organisation
Bird Machine Company, an American company from the 1900s
Bangalore Initiative for Religious Dialogue, an Indian interfaith organization
Ningbo Bird, a Chinese manufacturer of mobile phones

People

Bird (surname)
Bird (given name)
Bird (nickname)
Bird baronets, a title in the Baronetage of the United Kingdom

Places

Cape Bird, Ross Island, Antarctica
Mount Bird, Ross Island, Antarctica, a volcano
Bird, Manitoba, Fox Lake Cree Nation's primary reserve, Canada
Bird railway station
Bird, a neighborhood of Anchorage, Alaska, U.S.
Bird Key, an island (key) in Sarasota Bay, Florida, U.S.
Bird Key (Miami), Florida, U.S.
Bird River, Maryland, U.S.
Bird Road, State Road 976 in Florida, U.S.

Science and technology
BIRD (satellite), an Indian Earth observation satellite
Bird (technology), an interactive input device
Bird Internet routing daemon
ESO 593-8, a group of interacting galaxies also known as "The Bird"

Transportation and ships
Bird-class minesweeper, of the Royal New Zealand Navy
Lapwing-class minesweeper, often called the Bird class, of the U.S. Navy
Bird-class patrol vessel, of the Royal Navy
Bird class, GWR 3300 Class steam locomotives
Robertson B1-RD, an ultralight aircraft

Other uses
Bird (gesture), an obscene hand gesture
The Bird (mascot), of the U.S. Air Force Falcons

See also
 
Birds (disambiguation), including Bird's
Byrd (disambiguation)
Birdsong (disambiguation)